The Polish Rhythmic Gymnastics Championships (pl. Mistrzostwa Polski w gimnastyce artystycznej) are a rhythmic gymnastics competition held annually to determine the national medalists of Poland. The event has been held annually since 1955.

The separate competitions are held individually, in groups and in teams, for all the age categories.

Medalists

Senior medalists in individual all-around

Senior gold medalists by apparatus

Senior gold medalists in group all-around

Sources

 Polish Gymnastics Association Official Homepage

Polish
Rhythmic gymnastics
Gymnastics